Raphaël, Comte de Casabianca (1738–1825), French general, was descended from a noble Corsican family.

In 1769 he took the side of France against Genoa, then mistress of the island. In 1793, having entered the service of the revolutionary government, he was appointed lieutenant-general in Corsica in place of Pasquale Paoli, who was outlawed for intrigues with England.

For his defence of Calvi against the English he was appointed general of division, and he served in Italy from 1794 to 1798. After the 18th of Brumaire he entered the senate and was made count of the empire in 1806.

In 1814 he joined the party of Louis XVIII, rejoined Napoleon during the Hundred Days, and in 1819 succeeded again in entering the chamber of peers. His nephew Louis was a soldier and poet.

1738 births
1825 deaths
Corsican politicians
Counts of France
French commanders of the Napoleonic Wars
French generals
Raphael